Neal Robert Bishop (born 7 August 1981) is an English professional footballer who plays as a midfielder and is player/manager of Gainsborough Trinity. 

He previously played in the Football League for Barnet, Notts County, Blackpool, Scunthorpe United and Mansfield Town, as well as at Non-league level for Billingham Town, Spennymoor United, Whitby Town, Scarborough, York City and Scarborough Athletic. He also represented England C at international level.

Club career

Early career
Born in Stockton-on-Tees, County Durham, Bishop began his career with Middlesbrough in their youth system. After being released by Middlesbrough as a teenager he moved to Northern League club Billingham Town and played there for a number of years. In a match in 2001, he played alongside his brother Craig, aged 16, and father Rob, aged 46, as the team had eight matches to play in 15 days towards the end of the 2000–01 season. He made 11 appearances and scored two goals for Gateshead in all competitions in the 2002–03 season, before leaving in October 2002 and re-signing for Billingham. He played for Spennymoor United in the 2003–04 season, making 38 appearances and scoring three goals. He made 25 appearances and scored one goal for Whitby Town in the 2004–05 season.

Scarborough
He signed for Scarborough of the Conference National in March 2005 on a contract until the end of the 2004–05 season, following a week-long trial. He made 11 appearances and scored one goal for Scarborough during this season, and signed a deal to keep him at the club for the 2005–06 season in May. Here, he made a name for himself and was chosen as captain for the 2005–06 season. His lip was cut in an alleged clash with Denny Ingram in the tunnel following a match against Halifax Town in November, which Bishop decided not to press charges against.

York City
He was signed by Scarborough's Conference National rivals York City for an undisclosed nominal fee on 31 January 2006. He finished the season with 14 appearances and one goal for York and signed a new contract with the club in July. He scored the winning goal against Oxford United with a 20-yard volley on the final day of the 2006–07 season, meaning York secured a place in the Conference National play-offs. He was voted as the York City Clubman of the Year for the season the same day, finishing the season with 49 appearances and scoring three goals. Bishop rejected a new deal at York, saying he wanted his salary to fall in line with the club's top earners.

Barnet
He signed for League Two club Barnet in June 2007 on a free transfer as he was out of contract with York. He said he decided to join Barnet so he could fulfil a lifelong ambition of playing in the Football League. He made his debut against Morecambe on 11 August 2007 and was sent off for violent conduct in his second match against Norwich City in the League Cup on 14 August 2007, which resulted in a three-match suspension. He finished the 2007–08 season with 47 appearances and two goals for Barnet, and handed in a transfer request in April 2008 after turning down an improved contract with the club. Despite this, the club exercised their option to extend his contract for another season in May. He was removed from the transfer list at his own request after the start of the 2008–09 season.

Bishop was appointed as Barnet's captain in November after Ismail Yakubu gave up the role. He suffered a fractured jaw after being kicked in the face during a match against Darlington by Ricky Ravenhill in December, which ruled him out for the Christmas period. He finished the season with 48 appearances, scoring one goal, and was offered a new contract at Barnet.

Notts County
Bishop agreed to join fellow League Two team Notts County on 20 May 2009, and a day later he signed a pre-contract agreement to join the club on 1 July. He made 51 appearances and scored one goal for the club during the 2009–10 season, in which County won the League Two title and thus promotion to League One. He signed a two-year contract extension with County on 5 July 2010, which contracted him at the club until June 2012. In January 2011, he scored in County's 1–1 draw against Premier League team Manchester City in the fourth round of the FA Cup, which saw them earn a replay at the City of Manchester Stadium. During the closing stages of the 2010–11 season, he was named as the new team captain by Paul Ince. He finished the 2010–11 season with 51 appearances and two goals, and was voted by supporters as Notts County's Player of the Year. On 10 May 2011, Bishop signed a new two-year contract with County, keeping him at the club until June 2013. His contract with the club was cancelled by mutual consent on 19 June 2013.

Blackpool
Bishop signed for Championship club Blackpool on 2 August 2013 on a five-month contract. He scored his first goal for Blackpool in a 2–1 win over AFC Bournemouth on 14 September 2013. On 2 December 2013, Bishop extended his contract at Blackpool until the end of the 2013–14 season.

Scunthorpe United
Bishop signed for newly promoted League One club Scunthorpe United on 19 June 2014 on a two-year contract.

Mansfield Town
Bishop signed for League Two club Mansfield Town on 6 June 2018. He was released by Mansfield at the end of the 2019–20 season.

Non-League
Bishop joined Scarborough Athletic in September 2020 after turning down offers from a number of clubs higher in the football pyramid. After the season was annulled, Bishop announced his departure from the club in March 2021.

On 17 May 2021, Bishop joined Gainsborough Trinity in a player-coach role.

On 24 May 2022, Bishop was appointed joint-manager at Gainsborough along with Damon Parkinson.

International career
Bishop was called up for the England national C team in May 2007 to play in the Four Nations Tournament. He made his debut in a 5–0 win over the Republic of Ireland on 22 May 2007, winning his second and final cap when England beat Wales 3–0 on 27 May. England won the tournament, having been unbeaten and not conceded a goal in three matches.

Personal life
Bishop married his fiancé Frances in May 2014. The couple had their first child together, Oscar, in January 2013. Frances owns and runs a Children's outlet 'Pud'. She was also a candidate on Series 12 of The Apprentice which began in October 2016./

Career statistics

Honours
Notts County
Football League Two: 2009–10

Individual
Notts County Player of the Year: 2010–11
York City Clubman of the Year: 2006–07

References

External links

Neal Bishop profile at the Mansfield Town F.C. website

1981 births
Living people
Footballers from Stockton-on-Tees
Footballers from County Durham
English footballers
England semi-pro international footballers
Association football midfielders
Middlesbrough F.C. players
Billingham Town F.C. players
Gateshead F.C. players
Spennymoor United F.C. players
Whitby Town F.C. players
Scarborough F.C. players
York City F.C. players
Barnet F.C. players
Notts County F.C. players
Blackpool F.C. players
Scunthorpe United F.C. players
Mansfield Town F.C. players
Scarborough Athletic F.C. players
Gainsborough Trinity F.C. players
Northern Football League players
Northern Premier League players
National League (English football) players
English Football League players
Gainsborough Trinity F.C. managers
Association football coaches